"Under the Boardwalk" is a pop song written by Kenny Young and Arthur Resnick and recorded by the Drifters in 1964. It charted at number four on the Billboard Hot 100 chart on August 22, 1964. The song has since been covered by many other artists, with versions by Bette Midler, Sam & Dave, the Tom Tom Club, the Rolling Stones, Billy Joe Royal, The Beach Boys, Bruce Willis, Bad Boys Blue, John Mellencamp and Lynn Anderson all charting in the United States or overseas. The song ranked number 487 on Rolling Stone list of The 500 Greatest Songs of All Time in 2004 and number 489 in 2010.

Premise
The lyric describes a tryst between a man and his beloved in a seaside town, who plan to privately meet "out of the sun" and out of sight from everyone else under a boardwalk. The instrumentation includes güiro, triangle and violins. The song's chorus switches from a major to minor key. The opening line of the song references the Drifters' prior hit "Up on the Roof", showing the occasional thermal weakness of the rooftop getaway and setting the stage for an alternate meeting location, under the boardwalk.
Also, the violins are heard playing the riff of "Up on the Roof", before the chorus.

History
The song was set to be recorded on May 21, 1964, but the band's lead singer, Rudy Lewis, died of a suspected heroin overdose the night before. Lewis had sung lead on most of their hits since the 1960 departure of Ben E. King, including "Up on the Roof". Rather than reschedule the studio session, the lead on "Under the Boardwalk" was given to the group's other lead vocalist, Johnny Moore, who had returned to the group in April 1963. The personnel on that recording included Ernie Hayes on piano, Everett Barksdale, Bill Suyker and Bob Bushnell on guitar, Milt Hinton on bass, Gary Chester on drums and George Devens on percussion. The last-minute move was a success, as the single, released on Atlantic Records, went to number four on the Billboard Hot 100 charts and number one for three non consecutive weeks on Cashbox magazine's R&B chart.

Cover versions

A cover of this song by the Rolling Stones was released the same year as the original version. Their version was released as a single only in Australia, South Africa and Rhodesia, and peaked at No. 1 in the first two (the song was the band's first No. 1 hit in Australia) and at No. 2 in Rhodesia. It appeared on their albums 12 X 5 and The Rolling Stones No. 2. In 2007, it was included on the album Rhythms del Mundo Classics.

In 1966, Los Apson released a Spanish-language version titled "Fue en un Café", which was a hit in Latin America, reaching the top 5 in Mexico.

"Under the Boardwalk" has since been covered by many artists, including Bette Midler (number 26 in Australia), and the Tom Tom Club (whose version reached number 22 on the UK Singles Chart in 1982, becoming the first version of the song to chart in Britain). Versions by Billy Joe Royal, Bruce Willis (a number 2 success in the UK), and Lynn Anderson (number 24 on the Country chart) all reached the Billboard charts.

John Mellencamp released the track as the B-side of his single "R.O.C.K. in the U.S.A.". In Australia, the single effectively became a double-A side when the B-side "Under the Boardwalk" received significant airplay and both tracks were listed together on the singles chart, reaching number 18. The track also reached number 19 on the Billboard Top Rock Tracks chart.

In pop culture
In 2001, children’s music artist Bill Harley parodied the song as “Down in the Backpacks” for his 2001 preschool music album of the same name and this track was frequently played on SiriusXM’s Kids Place Live radio station.

Chart history

Weekly charts
The Drifters' original version

Year-end charts

Rolling Stones cover

Billy Joe Royal cover

Tom Tom Club cover

John Mellencamp cover

Bruce Willis cover

Lynn Anderson cover

Bette Midler cover

See also
1964 in music

References

1964 singles
Atlantic Records singles
Decca Records singles
Motown singles
Billy Joe Royal songs
The Drifters songs
The Rolling Stones songs
Bette Midler songs
Lynn Anderson songs
Number-one singles in Australia
Number-one singles in South Africa
Songs written by Kenny Young
Tom Tom Club songs
1964 songs
Songs written by Artie Resnick
Song recordings produced by Bert Berns